Neosho is a Native American word generally accepted to be of Osage derivation. It is translated variously as "water that has been made muddy", "clear cold water" or "clear water", the last being the most accepted.

Neosho may refer to:

Places in the United States 
 Neosho, Missouri, a city in Newton County
 Neosho National Fish Hatchery, Newton County, Missouri
 Neosho, Wisconsin, a village
 Neosho County, Kansas
 Neosho State Fishing Lake, Neosho County, Kansas
 Neosho River, a tributary of the Arkansas River in Kansas and Oklahoma

United States Navy 
 USS Neosho, several ships
 Neosho class, a class of oiler
 Neosho-class monitor, a pair of ironclad American Civil War river monitors

See also 
 Neosho Falls, Kansas, a city
 Neosho Rapids, Kansas, a city
 Neosho madtom, a small catfish
 Neosho mucket, a species of freshwater mussel